Cabrera Nunatak is a nunatak  northeast of Putzke Peak in the McCuddin Mountains, Marie Byrd Land. It was mapped by the United States Geological Survey from surveys and from U.S. Navy air photos, 1959–65, and named by the Advisory Committee on Antarctic Names for Quirino Cabrera, a U.S. Navy Construction Mechanic at Byrd Station, 1966 and 1969.

References 

Nunataks of Marie Byrd Land